Webb Lane House is a historic home located at Highland Falls in Orange County, New York. It was built in 1903 and is a two-story brick and stucco dwelling with a hipped roof and deep overhang supported by massive paired brackets.  It features an engaged three story tower and a porch supported by heavy timbers.  The home has been converted to apartments.

It was listed on the National Register of Historic Places in 1982. house pictured is not the Webb lane house.  The house in photo is on Michels rd.

References

Houses on the National Register of Historic Places in New York (state)
Houses in Orange County, New York
National Register of Historic Places in Orange County, New York
Houses completed in 1903
Highland Falls, New York